Støstad is a surname. Notable people with the surname include:

Jan-Erik Støstad (born 1953), Norwegian politician
Rune Støstad (born 1972), Norwegian politician
Sverre Støstad (1887–1959), Norwegian politician

Norwegian-language surnames